Maguni Charan Das was an Indian traditional dancer of Gotipua, a traditional dance form of Odisha.

Life

He was the founder of Dasabhuja Gotipua Odishi Nrutya Praishad, a school for Gotipua dance where the art form is taught in the traditional Gurukul way. Born in Raghurajpur, in Puri district of the Indian state of Odisha, he is known to have contributed to the revival of Gotipua tradition, which is widely considered as the precursor of the classical dance form of Odissi. His style of performance is known as the Raghurajpur Gharana of Gotipua and his school provides training in the dance discipline, while taking care of the academic education of the students. He was a recipient of Odisha Sangeet Natak Akademi Award and Tulsi Award. The Government of India awarded him the fourth highest civilian honour of the Padma Shri, in 2004, for his contributions to Gotipua dance.

Das died on 5 December 2008.

See also 
 Gotipua
Mardala

References 

Year of birth missing
2008 deaths
Recipients of the Padma Shri in arts
People from Puri district
Dancers from Odisha
Indian male dancers
Performers of Indian classical dance
20th-century Indian dancers